Almora is an unincorporated community in Kane County, in the U.S. state of Illinois.

History
Almora had its start in the 1880s when the railroad was extended to that point. A post office called Almora was established in 1885, and remained in operation until it was discontinued in 1910. Although an older source states Almora was named after "a European city", a more recent source proposes the name may be after Almora, in India.

References

Unincorporated communities in Kane County, Illinois
1885 establishments in Illinois
Unincorporated communities in Illinois